Lucasfilm Animation Ltd. LLC is the animation division of Lucasfilm, established in 2003. Its first major productions were the feature film Star Wars: The Clone Wars and its associated television series, both of which debuted in 2008. In September 2016, Dave Filoni, known for his contributions to Star Wars: The Clone Wars and Star Wars Rebels, accepted a promotion to oversee the development of all future Lucasfilm Animation projects.

Lucasfilm Animation Singapore

Founded in 2003 in Singapore as a means to tap into the talent pool, Lucasfilm Animation Singapore (LAS) opened in October 2005. LAS works closely with Lucasfilm Animation. The LAS production schedule also includes contributions to projects from other Lucasfilm companies. While the largest of LAS’ production groups focused on Star Wars: The Clone Wars, in July 2006 LAS announced the creation of the Game Group and the Digital Artists Group (DAG). With difficulty in meeting the technical and aesthetic requirements of Clone Wars, LAS was ultimately removed from the production and released a number of employees.

The Game Group developed and announced Star Wars: The Clone Wars – Jedi Alliance on the Nintendo DS in 2008.

R2-D2 is featured in the company logo at the end of Star Wars: The Clone Wars.

The Digital Artists Group serves as an extension of Industrial Light & Magic, contributing to ILM's work on feature film visual effects. LAS had supported LucasArts’ video game productions and Lucasfilm Animation.

In November 2007, Lucasfilm Animation Singapore launched the Jedi Masters Program, a paid apprenticeship providing young artists with mentorship opportunities from industry professionals at ILM, LucasArts and Lucasfilm Animation. The Jedi Masters Program has classroom facilities within the Singapore studio and combines classroom instruction with mentored work in an actual production environment.

Due to its old building being saturated, Lucasfilm Singapore moved into a new building at the beginning of 2014.

Filmography

Feature films

Released films

Television series
 Star Wars: The Clone Wars (2008–2013) for Cartoon Network, (2014) for Netflix, (2020) for Disney+
 Star Wars Rebels (2014–18) for Disney XD
 Star Wars Resistance (2018–20) for Disney Channel and Disney XD
 Star Wars: The Bad Batch (2021–present) for Disney+
 Tales of the Jedi (2022) for Disney+
 Star Wars: Young Jedi Adventures (2023) for Disney+ and Disney Junior
 Star Wars Detours (unaired)

Shorts and specials
 Star Wars Rebels shorts (2014) for YouTube
 Star Wars Blips shorts (2017) for YouTube
 Star Wars Forces of Destiny shorts (2017–18) for YouTube
 Star Wars Forces of Destiny specials (2017–18) for Disney XD
 Star Wars Resistance shorts (2018) for YouTube

References

2003 establishments in Singapore
American animation studios
American companies established in 2003
Companies based in San Francisco
Disney acquisitions
Disney production studios
Film studios
Lucasfilm
Mass media companies established in 2003